Yuanbao Temple is a temple located in North District, Taichung City, Taiwan. The temple is dedicated to the Taoist deity Baosheng Dadi.

History 

Historically, the area around Yuanbao Temple was known as Laicuobu, named after Lai family from Pinghe County that settled there. The clanspeople brought a copy of Baosheng Dadi from Xintian Temple in Zhangzhou and built a temple in 1791 for the deity, with the help of the following seventeen villages:

  (賴厝廍)
  (乾溝子) 
  (田心子)
  (犁頭店)
  (土庫)
  (麻園頭)
  (後壠子)
  (東大墩)
  (邱厝子)
  (三十張犁)
  (水景頭)
  (廍子)
  (軍功寮)
  (舊社)
  (二分埔)
  (三分埔)
  (水湳)

The temple had a large influence on the region and was the religious center those seventeen villages. Major renovations were done to the temple in 1846 and 1924. In 1962, the seventh-generation keeper of the temple's son formed a committee and started several expansion projects to the temple complex, which added several new halls for more deities.

The pilgrims believed that Baijiao Ciji Temple is the successor to Xintian Temple, but when they arrived, they did not find any evidence of this claim. Later, they traveled to the nearby , where they found documents belonging to Xintian Temple. Hence, Yuanbao Temple recognizes the latter as its predecessor.

Festivals 
The largest annual festival at Yuanbao Temple is the birth of Baosheng Dadi, celebrated between the tenth to fifteenth day of the third month in the Chinese calendar. During the festival, a parade of worshippers tour the six largest villages in the original seventeen, spending one day in each village in this order: Houlongzi, Mayuantou, Qiucuozi, Sanshizhangli, Erfenpu, and Laicuopu. The statue used in the festival is the black-faced Baosheng Dadi; according to legend, this statue went missing in Nantou County and was found by worshippers a decade later. Then, Baosheng Dadi appeared to them asking to return to Yuanbao Temple. After its return, worshippers regard this statue as the most powerful in the temple's possessions.

During Lantern Festival, Yuanbao Temple is one of the few temples that use candle lanterns instead of LED lights. The temple also holds glove puppetry shows for the public.

See also 
 Dalongdong Baoan Temple, Taipei
 List of temples in Taichung
 List of temples in Taiwan

References 

1791 establishments in Taiwan
Religious buildings and structures completed in 1791
Taoist temples in Taichung